Hvozd may refer to places in the Czech Republic:

Hvozd (Plzeň-North District), a municipality and village in the Plzeň Region
Hvozd (Prostějov District), a municipality and village in the Olomouc Region
Hvozd (Rakovník District), a municipality and village in the Central Bohemian Region